Edgar Vos (5 July 1931 – 13 January 2010) was a Dutch fashion designer.

Vos was born in Makassar in the Dutch East Indies (now Indonesia) in 1931. He studied fashion at the Gerrit Rietveld Academie in Amsterdam.

He started a chain of fifteen boutique clothing stores known as Edgar Vos Boutiques.

Vos died of a heart attack while holidaying in Fort Lauderdale, Florida, a day after being admitted to a hospital suffering from what is suspected to have been pneumonia. He was 78.

He is survived by his partner, Geert Eijsbouts.

References

External links
Edgar Vos Boutiques official website 

1931 births
2010 deaths
Dutch fashion designers
LGBT fashion designers
People from Makassar
World War II civilian prisoners held by Japan